In mathematics, in the theory of differential equations and dynamical systems, a particular stationary or quasistationary solution to a nonlinear system is called linearly unstable if the linearization of the equation at this solution has the form , where r is the perturbation to the steady state, A is a linear operator whose spectrum contains eigenvalues with positive real part. If all the eigenvalues have negative real part, then the solution is called linearly stable. Other names for linear stability include  exponential stability or stability in terms of first approximation. If there exist an eigenvalue with zero real part then the question about stability cannot be solved on the basis of the first approximation and we approach the so-called "centre and focus problem".

Examples

Ordinary differential equation
The differential equation 

has two stationary (time-independent) solutions: x = 0 and x = 1.
The linearization at x = 0 has the form
. The linearized operator is A0 = 1. The solutions to this equation grow exponentially; 
the stationary point x = 0 is linearly unstable.

, where .

Nonlinear Schrödinger Equation
The nonlinear Schrödinger equation
To derive the linearization at a solitary wave, one considers the solution in the form
.

where 
with 
and 
the differential operators.
According to Vakhitov–Kolokolov stability criterion,

It should be mentioned that linear stability does not automatically imply stability;
in particular, when , the solitary waves are unstable.

See also
Asymptotic stability
Linearization (stability analysis)
Lyapunov stability
Orbital stability
Stability theory
Vakhitov–Kolokolov stability criterion

References

Stability theory
Solitons